The Parkland Conference was a division of the Wisconsin Interscholastic Athletic Association (WIAA) from the 1963 to the 2006 school season. It was formed in 1963 when the Braveland Conference split in two.

In 2020, it was announced that the Parkland Conference would be returning for football for at least the next two seasons, replacing one of the Woodland Conference's divisions in the new football-only alignment.

Membership history
1963-1970
Franklin Sabers
Greendale Panthers
Greenfield Hustlin' Hawks
Muskego Warriors
New Berlin Vikings
Oak Creek Knights
St. Francis Mariners
Whitnall Falcons

1970-1980
Franklin Sabers
Greendale Panthers
Greenfield Hustlin' Hawks
Muskego Warriors
New Berlin Eisenhower Lions
New Berlin Vikings
Oak Creek Knights
St. Francis Mariners
Whitnall Falcons

1980-1983
Western Division
Franklin Sabers
Kettle Moraine Lasers
New Berlin Eisenhower Lions
Pewaukee Pirates
Slinger Owls
St. Francis Mariners
Whitnall Falcons

Eastern Division
Greendale Panthers
Greenfield Hustlin' Hawks
Mukwonago Indians
Muskego Warriors
New Berlin Vikings
Oak Creek Knights
Racine Case Eagles

1983-1985
Western Division
Franklin Sabers
Kettle Moraine Lasers
New Berlin Eisenhower Lions
Pewaukee Pirates
Slinger Owls
St. Francis Mariners
Whitnall Falcons

Eastern Division
Greendale Panthers
Greenfield Huslin' Hawks
Mukwonago Indians
Muskego Warriors
New Berlin Vikings
Oak Creek Knights

1985-1992
Brown Deer Falcons
Franklin Sabers
New Berlin Eisenhower Lions
New Berlin Vikings (became West in 1986)
Pewaukee Pirates
Slinger Owls
St. Francis Mariners
West Milwaukee Mustangs
Whitnall Falcons

1992-1993
Brown Deer Falcons
Franklin Sabers
New Berlin Eisenhower Lions
New Berlin West Vikings
Pewaukee Pirates
Shorewood Greyhounds
Slinger Owls
St. Francis Mariners
Whitnall Falcons

1993-1997
Brown Deer Falcons
Hamilton (Sussex) Chargers
New Berlin Eisenhower Lions
New Berlin West Vikings
Pewaukee Pirates
Shorewood Greyhounds
Slinger Owls
St. Francis Mariners
Whitnall Falcons

1997-1998
Brown Deer Falcons
Dominican (Whitefish Bay) Knights
Greendale Martin Luther Spartans
Pewaukee Pirates
Shorewood Greyhounds
Slinger Owls
St. Francis Mariners

1998-2003
Brown Deer Falcons
Dominican (Whitefish Bay) Knights
Greendale Martin Luther Spartans
Kettle Moraine Lutheran Chargers
Luther Preparatory School (Watertown) Phoenix
Pewaukee Pirates
Shorewood Greyhounds
Slinger Owls
St. Francis Mariners

2003-2006
Brown Deer Falcons
Dominican (Whitefish Bay) Knights
Kettle Moraine Lutheran Chargers
Luther Preparatory School (Watertown) Phoenix
Pewaukee Pirates
Shorewood Greyhounds
Slinger Owls
St. Francis Mariners

2020- (Football Only)
Catholic Memorial Crusaders
Milwaukee Lutheran Red Knights
New Berlin Eisenhower Lions
New Berlin West Vikings
Pewaukee Pirates
Pius XI Popes
Wauwatosa East Red Raiders
Wauwatosa West Trojans

Dissolution

In 2006 the Conference ceased to exist and members were reassigned.  St. Francis, Pewaukee, and Brown Deer went to the Woodland Conference. Whitefish Bay Dominican now competes in the Midwest Classic-Classic Division; Watertown Luther Prep joined the Capitol-Northern Division; Slinger shifted to the Wisconsin Little Ten; and Kettle Moraine Lutheran moved to the Wisconsin Flyway.

Conference champions

Baseball

Boys' basketball

Girls' basketball

Division champions

Football

State tournament appearances 

1963-1964: Whitnall, Boys Track & Field Class B Runner Up (Coach Bob Huberty)
1964-1965: Greenfield, Summer Baseball Quarterfinal
1966-1967: Muskego, Summer Baseball Quarterfinal
1974-1975: Greendale, Girls Volleyball Class A Runner Up 
1975-1976: St. Francis, Boys Basketball Class B Champions (Coach Harold "Butch" McKeon)
1975-1976: St. Francis, Boys Track & Field Class B Champions (Coach James Fazen)
1975-1976: St. Francis, Boys Cross Country Class B Champion (Coach James Fazen)
1975-1976: Whitnall, Girls Basketball Class A Quarterfinal
1977-1978: Whitnall, Girls Basketball Class A Quarterfinal
1978-1979: Greenfield, Summer Baseball Semi-Final
1978-1979: Greendale, Girls Basketball Class A Runner Up
1978-1979: Greendale, Girls Volleyball Class A Semi-Final
1979-1980: Greendale, Summer Baseball Champion (Coach Robin Schrank)
1979-1980: Greendale, Girls Volleyball Class A Semi-Final
1980-1981: New Berlin Eisenhower, Boys Basketball Class A Quarterfinal (Coach Steve Gustafson)
1980-1981: Oak Creek, Girls Volleyball Class A Semi-Final
1980-1981: St. Francis, Girls Basketball Class B Semi-Final (Coach Phil Polasek)
1981-1982: Greendale, Summer Baseball Semi-Final (Coach Robin Schrank)
1981-1982: Oak Creek, Girls Volleyball Class A Semi-Final
1981-1982: Oak Creek, Girls Basketball Class A Semi-Final (Coach Myrt Jeske)
1981-1982: Racine Case, Boys Track & Field Class A Runner Up (Coach Bill Greiten)
1982-1983: Greenfield, Summer Baseball Champion (Coach Frank Benevides)
1982-1983: Oak Creek, Girls Volleyball Class A Champion (Coach Myrt Jeske)
1982-1983: Oak Creek, Girls Basketball Class A Runner Up (Coach Myrt Jeske)
1983-1984: Greenfield, Summer Baseball Semi-Final
1983-1984: Oak Creek, Girls Basketball Class A Semi-Final (Coach Myrt Jeske)
1983-1984: Oak Creek, Girls Volleyball Class A Runner Up (Coach Myrt Jeske)
1984-1985: Greendale, Summer Baseball Runner Up (Coach Robin Schrank)
1984-1985: New Berlin West, Girls Volleyball Class A Champion (Coach Ray Carney)
1985-1986: New Berlin Eisenhower, Football Division 2 Runner Up (Coach Frank Granger)
1985-1986: Whitnall, Boys Basketball Class B Semi-Final
1985-1986: New Berlin West, Girls Basketball Class B Semi-Final (Coach Gail Champion)
1986-1987: Brown Deer, Girls Track & Field Class B Champion (Coach Mike Novak)
1986-1987: Brown Deer, Girls Basketball Class B Semi-Final (Coach Ken Wall)
1986-1987: New Berlin West, Girls Volleyball Class A Semi-Final
1987-1988: Whitnall, Boys Basketball Class B Champion (Coach Kent Kroupa)
1987-1988: New Berlin West, Football Division 2 Runner Up (Coach Doug Lange)
1987-1988: New Berlin Eisenhower, Girls Basketball Class B Semi-Final (Coach Conrad Farmer)
1987-1988: New Berlin West, Girls Volleyball Class A Semi-Final
1988-1989: New Berlin Eisenhower, Summer Baseball Quarterfinal
1988-1989: Pewaukee, Girls Volleyball Class B Semi-Final
1989-1990: New Berlin Eisenhower, Football Runner Up (Coach Frank Granger)
1990-1991: Whitnall, Summer Baseball Champion (Coach Tom Grafenauer)
1990-1991: Brown Deer, Boys Golf Champions (Coach Paul Zurich)
1991-1992: Brown Deer, Boys Golf Runner Up (Coach Paul Zurich)
1991-1992: Brown Deer, Boys Soccer Semi-Final
1992-1993: Brown Deer, Girls Basketball Division 2 Semi-Final (Coach Ken Wall)
1992-1993: Brown Deer, Boys Soccer Division 2 Champion (Coach Andrew Maciejewski)
1992-1993: New Berlin West, Boys Soccer Division 2 Semi-Final
1993-1994: Whitnall, Fastpitch-Softball Division 1 Semi-Final
1993-1994: Hamilton (Sussex), Wrestling Div 1 Participant
1993-1994: Brown Deer, Boys Soccer Division 2 Semi-Final
1994-1995: Brown Deer, Boys Golf Runner Up (Coach Tim Nelson)
1994-1995: Whitnall, Fastpitch-Softball Division 1 Semi-Final
1994-1995: New Berlin Eisenhower, Fastpitch-Softball Division 1 Quarterfinal
1995-1996: New Berlin Eisenhower, Football Division 3 Champion (Coach Jeff Setz)
1995-1996: New Berlin West, Boys Golf Runner Up (Coach Dean Molinaro)
1995-1996: Pewaukee, Girls Volleyball Division 2 Semi-Final
1995-1996: Whitnall, Wrestling Division 1 Runner Up
1996-1997: New Berlin Eisenhower, Football Division 3 Champion (Coach Jeff Setz)
1996-1997: Whitnall, Summer Baseball Quarterfinal (Coach Jeff Bigler)
1996-1997: Brown Deer, Boys Track & Field Division 2 Champions (Coach Elliot Kramsky)
1997-1998: Brown Deer, Boys Track & Field Division 2 Champions (Coach Elliot Kramsky)
1997-1998: Shorewood, Boys Soccer Division 2 Champion (Coach Bohdan Nedilsky)
1997-1998: Slinger, Football Division 3 Runner Up (Coach Fred Spaeth)
1998-1999: Slinger, Football Division 3 Champions (Coach Fred Spaeth)
1999-2000: New Berlin West, Boys Basketball Division 2 Champion (Coach Jeff Lewiston)
2000-2001: Pewaukee, Boys Basketball Division 2 Runner Up (Coach Tim Reuter)
2000-2001: Slinger, Girls Basketball Division 2 Runner Up (Steve Reinhardt)
2001-2002: Kettle Moraine Lutheran, Girls Volleyball Division 3 Runner Up (Coach Doug Hext)
2001-2002: Pewaukee, Boys Golf Champions (Coach Mike Rapp)
2001-2002: Brown Deer, Boys Basketball Division 2 Semi-Final (Coach Mike Novak)
2002-2003: Kettle Moraine Lutheran, Girls Volleyball Division 3 Champion (Coach Doug Hext)
2002-2003: Pewaukee, Boys Golf Champions (Coach Mike Rapp)
2003-2004: Kettle Moraine Lutheran, Girls Volleyball Division 3 Champion (Coach Doug Hext)
2004-2005: Kettle Moraine Lutheran, Girls Volleyball Division 3 Champion (Coach Doug Hext)
2004-2005: St. Francis, Football Division 4 Runner Up (Wisconsin Hall of Fame Coach Doug Sarver)
2004-2005: Brown Deer, Boys Track & Field Runner Up (Coach Rob Green)
2004-2005: Shorewood, Boys Soccer Division 2 Runner Up (Coach Carlos Gomez)
2005-2006: Slinger, Boys Soccer Division 2 Champion (Coach Michael Martinich)
2005-2006: Kettle Moraine Lutheran, Girls Volleyball Division 3 Runner Up (Coach Doug Hext)
2005-2006: Brown Deer, Boys Track & Field Runner Up (Coach Rob Green)
2005-2006: Slinger, Girls Soccer Division 2 Semifinal

See also
Wisconsin Interscholastic Athletic Association
List of high school athletic conferences in Wisconsin
List of high schools in Wisconsin
List of high school athletic conferences in Wisconsin

References

External links
Wisconsin Interscholastic Athletic Association

Sports organizations established in 1963
Organizations disestablished in 2006
Wisconsin high school sports conferences
1963 establishments in Wisconsin
2006 disestablishments in Wisconsin